Ghaz Al-Junoob, transliterated: (South Gas Club) is an Iraqi multi-sport club based in Basra, that plays in Iraq Division Two.

Other games

Volleyball  
The Ghaz Al-Junoob volleyball team won the Iraqi volleyball League title at 2011–12, 2012–13, 2013–14, 2014–15 and 2017–18 seasons, and won the 2014 Al-Muthabara Cup. The team also participated in the AVC Club Volleyball Championship and Arab Clubs Championship as a representative of Iraq.

Futsal  
The Ghaz Al-Junoob futsal team won the 2013–14 Iraq Futsal's 1st Division title

References

External links
 Team's profile on kooora.com
 Iraq Clubs- Foundation Dates

Football clubs in Iraq
2003 establishments in Iraq
Association football clubs established in 2003
Football clubs in Basra
Basra